Art Projects International is a contemporary art gallery located in TriBeCa, New York City. It focuses on works of art by leading contemporary artists with diverse international backgrounds.

History
Art Projects International was founded in 1993 and opened its first commercial gallery space in the SoHo section of Manhattan. The gallery specializes in contemporary art, focusing on works by leading artists with diverse international backgrounds. It advises on and facilitates exhibitions of works by contemporary artists for museums, institutions and private collectors and has worked with the San Jose Museum of Art, the Brooklyn Museum, the Queens Museum of Art, the Crow Museum of Asian Art and The Vilcek Foundation.

In May 1996, the gallery hosted the first show of Jung Hyang Kim, a New York painter born in Korea, whose work skilfully juxtaposed naturalistic and abstract forms.

In September 1996, it exhibited Yeong Gill Kim, a Korean artist living in New York, whose work in black and white acrylic, showed crowds of small figures in smudged landscapes, showing "on the conservative end of the spectrum in this case, that contemporary Asian artists are drawing ideas from a blend of Western and non-Western traditions."

In 2006, Art Projects International was part of a consortium of galleries staging Contemporary Asian Arts week, with particular emphasis on Chinese artists; it was one of the galleries making inroads to China through cultural exchange programs.

In March 2008, Art Projects International exhibited a survey of Iranian-born New York artist Pouran Jinchi's works, spanning a decade from 1995–2005. Here "the evolution of Jinchi’s abstract syntax suggested a symbiosis between the artist’s method and her minimalist format."

In March 2010, the gallery showed "a brilliant selection of ballpoint pen drawings" by Il Lee, a Korean-born New York artist, who has used the medium for over 30 years in a large variety of styles and sizes of composition.

In late 2011, Art Projects International presented an exhibition of Il Lee entitled Monoprints, Editions and Paintings. Four of the monoprints first shown in this exhibition were acquired by The Metropolitan Museum of Art for their permanent collection in early 2012.

The gallery's third solo exhibition of Pouran Jinchi, presented a series of new drawings in March 2012. One large-scale work from this exhibition was acquired by The Metropolitan Museum of Art for their permanent collection that same year.

References

External links
Art Projects International – official website

Contemporary art galleries in the United States
Art museums and galleries in Manhattan
1993 establishments in New York City
Art galleries established in 1993
Tribeca